Capitalism is an economic and social system in which the means of production are privately controlled.

Capitalism may also refer to:

 Economic liberalism, a system in which economic decisions are made by individuals or households rather than by collective institutions or organizations
 Capitalism (video game), a 1995 computer game
 Capitalism (sculpture), Portland, Oregon
 Capitalism: A Love Story, a 2009 documentary film by Michael Moore
 Capitalist mode of production (Marxist theory), the socio-economic base of a capitalist society